Hispa is a genus of leaf beetles in the subfamily Cassidinae. 7 valid species are known.

Species
The following species are recognised in the genus Hispa:

Hispa atra Linnaeus 1767
Hispa brachycera (Gestro 1897)
Hispa fulvispinosa Medvedev 1992
Hispa ramosa Gyllenhal 1817
Hispa stygia (Chapuis 1877)
Hispa tarsata Swietojanska 2001
Hispa waiensis Borowiec & Swietojanska 2007

References

Chrysomelidae genera
Cassidinae
Taxa named by Carl Linnaeus